Xiuhtotontli is an Aztec group of gods that are forms of Xiuhtecuhtli. The Xiuhtotontli are Xiuhiztacuhqui, Xiuhtlatlauhqui, Xiuhcozauhqui, and Xiuhxoxoauhqui.

References

Aztec gods